The Bishop of Fulham is a suffragan bishop in the Diocese of London in the Church of England. The bishopric is named after Fulham, an area of south-west London; the see was erected under the Suffragans Nomination Act 1888 by Order in Council dated 1 February 1926.

Until 1980 the Bishop of Fulham was the bishop with episcopal oversight (delegated from the Bishop of London) of churches in northern and central Europe. In that year, responsibility for these parishes was transferred to the Bishop of Gibraltar as head of the renamed Diocese of Gibraltar in Europe.

At present, the Bishop of Fulham fulfils the role of a provincial episcopal visitor for the dioceses of London and Southwark. This means having pastoral oversight of those parishes in the Anglo-Catholic tradition which cannot, on grounds of theological conviction, accept the ordination of women to the priesthood and episcopate, or bishops who have participated in ordaining women. As of December 2017, 46 parishes in the Diocese of London (almost one eighth of the total number) receive alternative episcopal oversight (AEO) from the Bishop of Fulham.

In November 2010, following the announcement of Bishop John Broadhurst's resignation and reception into the Roman Catholic Church, the Bishop of London temporarily conferred episcopal oversight for traditionalist congregations in the two dioceses to the Bishop of Edmonton. On 31 October 2012 it was announced that Jonathan Baker, then Bishop of Ebbsfleet, would translate to Fulham, resuming Broadhurst's AEO responsibilities. This took place on 13 February 2013.

List of bishops

See also
 Bishop of Beverley
 Bishop of Ebbsfleet
 Bishop of Richborough
 List of Anglo-Catholic churches in England

References

External links
 Crockford's Clerical Directory listings

 
Fulham
Christianity in London